In Greek mythology, Myrmex is a young maiden who became a favourite of the goddess Athena. Her story survives in the works of fifth-century AD Latin grammarian Maurus Servius Honoratus.

Etymology 
The ancient Greek noun  means 'ant' and is derived from the Proto-Indo-European root *morwi- which means the same thing.

Mythology 
Myrmex was an Attican girl famed for her cleverness and her chastity, and for this reason she was loved by Athena, the virgin goddess of wisdom.

When Demeter created crops, Athena wished to show the Atticans an effective way of sowing the fields, so she created the plough, with Myrmex by her side. But Myrmex stole some sheaves, and boastfully claimed that she herself had invented the plough, and that only through 'her' invention the crops could be put to use. Athena, heartbroken by the girl's betrayal, hated Myrmex as she had once loved her, and turned her into an ant, doomed to only be able to steal crops. Zeus felt pity for her, so he honoured the ant, and when Aegina needed to be repopulated, he created a new race of men, the Myrmidons, out of transformed ants.

Due to the language used about Athena loving Myrmex, some have taken it to mean that the myth has homosexual undertones. Robert Graves theorized that Myrmex could be the name of some ancient Northern Greek mother-goddess who did invent the plough, and archaeology supports a claim for indigenous European invention.

See also 

 Arachne
 Medusa
 Metamorphoses in Greek mythology
 Myrmidons, ants who became people

Footnotes

References

Bibliography 
 
 
 Maurus Servius Honoratus. In Vergilii carmina comentarii. Servii Grammatici qui feruntur in Vergilii carmina commentarii; recensuerunt Georgius Thilo et Hermannus Hagen. Georgius Thilo. Leipzig. B. G. Teubner. 1881. Online version at the Topos Text Project.
  Online version at Perseus.tufts project.
 
  Online version at the Perseus.tufts Project.
 
 

Deeds of Athena
Metamorphoses into arthropods in Greek mythology
Attican characters in Greek mythology
Women in Greek mythology
LGBT themes in Greek mythology
Deeds of Zeus